Braňo Holiček (born 14 August 1985, Košice) is a Slovak actor and musician.

His parents recognised his talent at an early age, and enrolled him in a specialised elementary school specialisting in the arts. He performed in kids' talent programs on television, including Asterisk and Golden Gate. His first big breakthrough was in 1997, when he was chosen to play the lead in the national Slovak production of Oliver!, a part which he retained for a year and half. Afterwards, he also performed the title role in Janko Hraško under Ján Ďurovčík.

On 1 June 1998 he released his debut album on PolyGram. He also appeared on the soundtrack of the musical Fontána pre Zuzanu III ("A Fountain for Susan III").

He went on to appear in minor roles in TV movies, before his role in Thomas the Falconer ("Sokoliar Tomáš"). He is also well known in Slovakia for his voice-over work. He also had a role in About Smith Juraj.

As of 2001, he was attending the Prague Conservatory and frequently appeared as a guest on television, especially on the Czech TV Prima.

See also
 The 100 Greatest Slovak Albums of All Time

References

1985 births
Living people
Slovak actors
21st-century Slovak male singers